Brian Ballagh II O'Neill (Irish: Brian Ballach Ó Néill) was a lord of Clandeboye in medieval Ireland. A son of Niall Mór O'Neill, he succeeded his brother, Hugh O'Neill, to the lordship of Clandeboye after his death in 1524. He reigned until his own death in 1529, after which he was succeeded by his brother Phelim Bacagh O'Neill. O'Neill's nickname ballach meant "freckled".

References

Clandeboye
16th-century Irish people
O'Neill dynasty